Free Moral Agents were a collective of musicians brought together by Isaiah "Ikey" Owens (keyboardist from The Mars Volta) as a means to expand the sounds of what started as a solo recording project. In the spring of 2006 the band started playing shows around Long Beach and Los Angeles.

There was a time, before I put the record out, that I wasn't playing in Mars Volta anymore, and I had just bought a bunch of recording instruments. I'd always wanted to record my own record but never did, so [Free Moral Agents] really started with just me. I knew J, who was actually my girlfriend at the time's brother-in-law, who did poetry and sang and stuff, so I got together with him. This is before the vinyl. I was working at this record store and started talking to my friend Jeff Harris, who it turns out, was really good with Pro Tools, so I added him to the group. He's really a producer and doesn't really play with us live, but he's very much responsible for the sound of the record. I knew Mendee [Ichikawa] for several years, and we had worked on and off, but I knew we needed a female element to the group, so that's basically what Free Moral Agents is right there. As far as the music goes, it started as my project, but these people who I know I can trust, really bring it together.

In April 2009, Owens released two live tracks for free. In 2010, the group released its 2nd full-length album entitled Control This for Gold Standard Laboratories.

Members
 Isaiah "Ikey" Owens - keyboards, producer, concepts
 Mendee Ichikawa - vocals, echo, words, melodies
 Dennis Owens - bass, falsetto
 Ryan Reiff - drums, beats
 Reid Kinnett - rhodes, effects
 Jesse Carzello - guitar, noise

Discography 

Studio albums
Everybody's Favorite Weapon (2004)
Momma's Gun Club Vol. 1 (2006 as download on AlphaPup) (February 27, 2007, as download on iTunes)
Control This formerly The Honey in the Carcass of the Lion (September 28, 2010)

EPs
Self Titled 7-inch EP - Free Moral Agents (September 9, 2008, on clear red vinyl, Broken Tape Publishing [300 copies])
Chaine Infinie (2014)

Live Albums
"Live At The Prospector" (2010)

Singles
The Special 12 Singles Series - Free Moral Agents (2005 as 7-inch vinyl, 500 copies) (October 3, 2006, as download on iTunes [Special Twelve Singles Series])
"North Is Red" (b/w North is Red remix by Tony Allen) 10-inch vinyl single - Chocolate Industries  (2009)

Other Recordings
Looking For Lauryn Hill in Lakewood - Free Moral Agents (May 2007 as download on AlphaPup)

References

External links
 Free Moral Agents Official Site
 Official Facebook Page
 Official Twitter
 Official Myspace
 Interview with Isaiah in Modern Fix

Rock music groups from California
Musical groups from Los Angeles